The 1992 Internationaux de Strasbourg was a women's tennis tournament played on outdoor clay courts at the  Ligue d'Alsace de Tenis in Strasbourg, France that was part of Tier IV of the 1992 WTA Tour. It was the sixth edition of the tournament and was held from 18 May until 24 May 1992. Second-seeded Judith Wiesner won the singles title and earned $27,000 first-prize money.

Finals

Singles

 Judith Wiesner defeated  Naoko Sawamatsu 6–1, 6–3
 It was Wiesner's 1st title of the year and the 3rd of her career.

Doubles

 Patty Fendick /  Andrea Strnadová defeated   Lori McNeil /  Mercedes Paz 6–3, 6–4

References

External links
 ITF tournament edition details 
 Tournament draws

Internationaux de Strasbourg
Internationaux de Strasbourg
Internationaux de Strasbourg
Internationaux de Strasbourg